Barney & Friends is an American children's television series that originally ran on PBS Kids from April 6, 1992 to November 2, 2010.

Series overview

Episodes

Season 1 (1992)

Season 2 (1993)

Season 3 (1995)

Season 4 (1997)

Season 5 (1998)

Season 6 (1999–2000)

Season 7 (2002)

Season 8 (2003–2004)

Season 9 (2004–2005)

Season 10 (2006)

Season 11 (2007)

Season 12 (2008)

Season 13 (2009)

Season 14 (2010)
Season 14 consists of repackaged Season 10 and 11 episodes, but is still noted as a separate season.

Barney and the Backyard Gang (1988–1991)
1988
 The Backyard Show
 Three Wishes

1989
 A Day at the Beach

1990
 Waiting for Santa
 Campfire Sing-Along
 Barney Goes to School

1991
 Barney In Concert
 Rock with Barney

Specials (1992–2014)
Most specials were released direct-to-video unless noted.

Theatrical film (1998)

Episode videos
1992
 Barney's Birthday (September 1, 1992)

1993
 Barney's Best Manners (February 4, 1993)
 Barney Rhymes with Mother Goose (May 26, 1993)
 Barney's Home Sweet Homes (August 25, 1993)

1994
 Let's Pretend with Barney (January 9, 1994)
 Barney's Alphabet Zoo (April 27, 1994)

1995
 Barney's Families Are Special (February 7, 1995)
 Barney's Making New Friends (August 8, 1995)
 Riding In Barney's Car (September 26, 1995)

1996
 Barney's All Aboard For Sharing (January 23, 1996)
 Barney's Exercise Circus and Parade of Numbers (July 2, 1996)

1997
 Barney's Colors & Shapes (March 18, 1997)

1998
 Down On Barney's Farm (February 12, 1998)
 Barney's Good Clean Fun and Oh, Brother...She's My Sister (November 3, 1998)

2001
 A to Z with Barney (May 8, 2001)

2003
 Barney's It's A Happy Day (June 24, 2003)
 It's Nice to Meet You (June 24, 2003)
 Barney's Red, Yellow and Blue! (August 5, 2003)
 Barney's Numbers! Numbers! (August 5, 2003)
 Happy, Mad, Silly, Sad (December 16, 2003)

2004
 Movin' and Groovin'
 Let's Pretend With Barney
 Now I Know My ABCs
 Ready Set Play

2005
 Just Imagine
 Everyone Is Special

2007
 Shake Your Dino Tail 

2009
 Sharing is Caring 
 We Love Our Family 

2010
 Please and Thank You 
 Egg-Cellent Adventures 
 Furry Friends 

2011
 Musical Zoo 
 Shapes & Colors All Around 
 1-2-3 Learn 

2012
 Clean Up, Clean Up 
 Planes, Trains & Cars 
 All About Opposites 
 Most Loveable Moments 
 Let's Go to the Doctor 

2013
 Let's Go to the Moon
 Play with Barney 
 Dance with Barney 
 Imagine with Barney 
 Most Huggable Moments 
 Perfectly Purple 

2014
 Story Time with Barney
 Happy Birthday Barney 
 This is How I Feel

2015
 Tee-Riffic Bugs & Animals
 It's Showtime with Barney
 Barney's Worldwide Adventure!

2016
 Dinos in the Park

2017
 Playground Fun

Foreign language videos

Spanish language videos
 El Castillo Musical de Barney ¡en vivo! (Barney's Musical Castle Live!)
 Barney y su Mundo de Colores ¡en VIVO! (Barney's Colorful World LIVE!)
 La Gran Sorpresa de Barney (Barney's Big Surprise! Live on Stage)
 La Pijamada de Barney (Barney's Pajama Party)
 El Maravilloso Mundo que Copartimos (Barney: What A World We Share)
 El Super Circo de Barney (Barney's Super Singing Circus)
 Paseando con Barney por el Vecindario (Walk Around the Block with Barney)
 Es Divertido Transportarse (Round and Round We Go)
 Barney Buenos Dias, Buenas Noches (Barney's Good Day Good Night)
 Barney ¡en Vivo! en Nueva York (Barney Live! in New York City)
 Barney en Concierto (Barney in Concert)
 La Isla de la Imaginación (Imagination Island)
 Zoologico de Letras/Cantos y Juegos con Mama Gansa (Alphabet Zoo/Barney Rhymes with Mother Goose)
 Buenos Modales/Feliz Cumpleaños Barney (Barney's Best Manners/Barney's Birthday)
 Colores y Formas (Colors and Shapes)
 Esperando a Santa (Waiting for Santa)
 Barney en Concierto (Barney in Concert)
 Barney va a la Escuela (Barney goes to School)

Hebrew language videos
(The episode names in parentheses are the U.S. counterparts)
 Let's Imagine with Barney (Queen of Make Believe)
 Happy Birthday! (Happy Birthday Barney)
 Numbers (Carnival of Numbers)
 Music is Fun (Practice Makes Music)
 Colors (Treasure of Rainbow Beard)
 Family Is Love (My Family's Just Right for Me)
 Eating Right (Eat, Drink and Be Healthy)
 Hands Up On The Head (Hop to It!)
 Aleph Bet (Alphabet Soup)
 Forest Sounds (Hoo's in the Forest?)
 Go for a Ride in the Car (Are We There Yet?)
 Sailing to a Magical Island (Ship Ahoy!)
 How to Count to Ten (Having Tens of Fun!)

Korean language videos
 Barney & Friends Classic Collection (Korean 4 DVD's)
 Barney and Friends Classic Collection [Korean 4 DVD's]

Notes

References

External links

 Episodes and videos
Barney and Friends
Lists of videos